Yegoryevka is a rural locality (a village) in Shabagishsky Selsoviet, Kuyurgazinsky District, Bashkortostan, Russia. The population was 25 as of 2010. There is 1 street.

Geography 
Yegoryevka is located 19 km north of Yermolayevo (the district's administrative centre) by road. Karagayka is the nearest rural locality.

References 

Rural localities in Kuyurgazinsky District